George Douglas Cobb was an American lighthouse keeper who served at the Point Bonita Light near San Francisco.  On December 26, 1896, he saved three young men from drowning near the lighthouse, for which he was awarded a Silver Lifesaving Medal.

A United States Coast Guard buoy tender (WLM 564) based in San Pedro, California was named for Cobb.

See also
Coast Guard bio
Cutter Coat of Arms

Year of birth missing
Year of death missing
19th-century American people
United States Lighthouse Service personnel